Shortlands is a parliamentary constituency electing one representative to the National Parliament of Solomon Islands. It is one of eight constituencies in Western Province and covers the Shortland Islands.

The constituency was one of the thirty-eight original constituencies established for the First Parliament elected in 1976. Its first MP was Remesion Eresi.

List of MPs

Election results

2019

2014

2011 (by-election)

2010

2006

2001

1997

1993

References

Solomon Islands parliamentary constituencies
Western Province (Solomon Islands)
1993 establishments in the Solomon Islands
Constituencies established in 1993